Rachel Rasmussen (born 5 June 1984 in Auckland, New Zealand) is a New Zealand netball player of Samoan descent who plays in the position of goal defense and goal keeper. She has represented both New Zealand and  Samoa at the international level. Rasmussen was signed with the Auckland Diamonds in the Coca-Cola Cup (later the National Bank Cup) in 2000, continuing with the side until the competition's end in 2007. With the start of the ANZ Championship in 2008, she remained in Auckland with the new Northern Mystics side, alongside her sister Grace. She played two years with the Mystics, but was not signed on for 2010. However, she received a callup to the Wellington-based Central Pulse as a temporary replacement player for injured defender Katrina Grant.

In international netball, Rasmussen played with New Zealand U21 at the World Youth Netball Championships, winning silver in 2000 and gold in 2005. She has also represented Samoa at international level, playing in the 2003 Netball World Championships. She was again selected to represent New Zealand at the 2010 World Netball Series with younger sister Grace.

She has signed on with the Southern Steel for the 2013 season.

She again represented Samoa at the 2019 Netball World Cup after 16 years.

References

New Zealand netball players
Samoan netball players
Southern Steel players
Northern Mystics players
Central Pulse players
1984 births
Living people
ANZ Championship players
2019 Netball World Cup players
Netball players from Auckland
Auckland Diamonds players
2003 World Netball Championships players
New Zealand international Fast5 players